Kentucky Route 1723 (KY 1723) was a  north–south state highway in Lexington. It was deleted in 2018.

Route description
The southern terminus of the route was at U.S. Route 60 (Versailles Road). The northern terminus was at U.S. Route 421 (West Main Street). KY 1723 was named South Forbes Road for its entire length.

History
The route once extended south to U.S. Route 27 (South Limestone) via Red Mile Road and Virginia Street.

On November 16, 2017, the Kentucky Transportation Cabinet and the Lexington-Fayette County Urban Government reached an agreement to swap several streets in the Lexington metro area. KY 1723 was turned over to the city on March 16, 2018, resulting in its decommission. Also, US 27 was rerouted over Virginia Street that day (which was originally part of KY 1723). The section of US 27 on Upper Street and Bolivar Street was given to the city of Lexington.

Major intersections

See also 
 Roads of Lexington, Kentucky

References

External links
 

1723
1723